Milltown (formerly, Milton) is an unincorporated community in Loudoun County, Virginia.

External links

Unincorporated communities in Loudoun County, Virginia
Washington metropolitan area
Unincorporated communities in Virginia